Lloyd's slickhead (Narcetes lloydi) is a species of fish in the family Alepocephalidae (slickheads). The fish is found in the Indo-West Pacific: on Indian Ocean ridges, in the Arabian Sea and the South China Sea.

Etymology
The fish is named in honor of surgeon-naturalist Richard E. Lloyd (b. 1875), of the Marine Survey of India and a student of the deep-sea fishes caught by the RV ‘Investigator,’ in 1909.

References

Markle, D.F., 1986. Alepocephalidae. p. 218-223. In M.M. Smith and P.C. Heemstra (eds.) Smiths' sea fishes. Springer-Verlag, Berlin.

Alepocephalidae
Taxa named by Henry Weed Fowler
Fish described in 1934